Aghcheh Dizaj or Aghchehdizaj or Aghcheh Dizej may refer to:
 Aghcheh Dizaj, Malekan
 Aghcheh Dizej, Maragheh

See also
Aghjeh Dizaj (disambiguation)